Ames State Forest is in Henniker, New Hampshire. It was established after Flora Ames, a resident of Henniker, donated about 15 acres to the state for reforestation. Keyser Pond Campground on Keyser Pond and Craney Hill State Forest are nearby.

See also

List of New Hampshire state forests

References

Landforms of Merrimack County, New Hampshire
New Hampshire state forests